Gołębiewo may refer to the following places:
Gołębiewo, Kuyavian-Pomeranian Voivodeship (north-central Poland)
Gołębiewo, Pomeranian Voivodeship (north Poland)
Gołębiewo, West Pomeranian Voivodeship (north-west Poland)